Cedar Crest is a census-designated place (CDP) in Mayes County, Oklahoma, United States. The population was 312 at the 2010 census,  almost unchanged from the figure of 308 recorded in 2000.

Geography
Cedar Crest is located at  (36.112991, -95.168599).

Demographics

As of the census of 2000, there were 308 people, 109 households, and 78 families residing in the CDP. The population density was 53.3 people per square mile (20.6/km2). There were 123 housing units at an average density of 21.3/sq mi (8.2/km2). The racial makeup of the CDP was 64.29% White, 25.97% Native American, and 9.74% from two or more races. Hispanic or Latino of any race were 2.27% of the population.

There were 109 households, out of which 39.4% had children under the age of 18 living with them, 53.2% were married couples living together, 9.2% had a female householder with no husband present, and 28.4% were non-families. 21.1% of all households were made up of individuals, and 7.3% had someone living alone who was 65 years of age or older. The average household size was 2.83 and the average family size was 3.35.

In the CDP, the population was spread out, with 33.4% under the age of 18, 7.1% from 18 to 24, 31.2% from 25 to 44, 21.4% from 45 to 64, and 6.8% who were 65 years of age or older. The median age was 31 years. For every 100 females, there were 111.0 males. For every 100 females age 18 and over, there were 107.1 males.

The median income for a household in the CDP was $26,053, and the median income for a family was $26,125. Males had a median income of $44,167 versus $21,979 for females. The per capita income for the CDP was $15,663. About 24.3% of families and 30.0% of the population were below the poverty line, including 27.8% of those under the age of eighteen and 47.4% of those 65 or over.

See also

 List of census-designated places in Oklahoma

References

External links

Census-designated places in Mayes County, Oklahoma
Census-designated places in Oklahoma